Vibes is a rhythm action video game developed by UK-based studio Laughing Jackal. It was released as a PlayStation mini on the PlayStation Network in North America on June 8, 2010 and Europe on June 9, 2010.

Gameplay 

The gameplay of Vibes is typical of rhythm action games. The player is required to press buttons in a sequence dictated on the screen. By successfully timing button presses, the player scores. In Vibes, the player controls a customizable pointer and has to press the corresponding button as it approaches, in addition to having the correct direction.

List of music tracks
Sonic Boom Six – Back 2 Skool (Punk)
Craig Taro Gold – Itsuka (J-Pop)
Nikolai Rimsky-Korsakov – Flight of the Bumblebee/ William Tell medley (Classical)
RedCloud – Traveling Circus (Hip Hop)
The Words – FAG (Indie)
Fake Elegance – Hello (Pop)
Minimalist Orchestra – Flicker (D&B)
Jamsons Nook – Sway (Rock/Indie)
Acidman – Tekno (Techno)
Soundtrap – Secret Lover (main mix) (Electro)
The Jancee Pornick Casino – Dom Perignon Blues (Psychobilly)
Spit at Stars – Innocent Breathing (Alternative rock)
Papa Ross – Tiririri (Latin)

Reception 
Reviews of Vibes have been mixed, with Metacritic score of 72, whilst Kristan Reed of Eurogamer states that "developer Laughing Jackal seems to know exactly what buttons to press to get its audience nodding along appreciatively", PlayStation Official Magazine (UK) criticized the title's lack of artists such as Lady Gaga or Crystal Castles.

References

External links 
Vibes Official Developer Page

2010 video games
Laughing Jackal games
Music video games
Network
PlayStation Network games
Network
Single-player video games
Video games developed in the United Kingdom